Jalin Turner (born 18 May 1995) is an American mixed martial artist who currently competes in the lightweight division of the UFC. A professional since 2016, he has also competed for Bellator MMA, the World Series of Fighting, King of the Cage, and Tachi Palace Fights. As of October 24, 2022, he is #10 in the UFC lightweight rankings.

Background 
Born in San Bernardino, California, Turner attended Summit High School, where he was unable to play much sports such as football, basketball or track and field due to multiple injuries. Having the most talent in wrestling, Turner took up the sport during the pre-season of his sophomore year, but was unable to compete that season due to a broken finger. Frustrated by the recurring injuries, he started watching MMA bouts on television, which inspired him to try and practice the sport. With little money as a teenager and unable to afford combat training equipment, he would run and shadow box and used his family couch as a punching bag, until he joined Team Adrenaline which kickstarted his mixed martial arts career. Growing up, Turner was arachnophobic, and to overcome that fear, he began to collect tarantulas as pets. When he made his UFC debut he had 200 of them, earning his ring nickname "The Tarantula". At UFC Vegas 10 Turner had his official weight taken while holding a tarantula in his left hand.

Mixed martial arts career

Early career 
After compiling an amateur record of 5–2, Turner started his professional MMA career since 2016 and fought primarily in his home state of California. He amassed a record of 7–3, with two-fight winning streak including a technical knockout win against Noah Tillis in Bellator 192, before signed by UFC.

Dana White's Tuesday Night Contention Series 
Turner faced Max Mustaki on June 19, 2018 at Dana White's Contender Series 12, winning by technical knockout in round one.

Ultimate Fighting Championship 
Turner made his UFC debut against Vicente Luque on October 6, 2018 at UFC 229, losing by knockout in the first round.

In his second UFC fight Turner was scheduled to face Alex Gorgees at UFC 234. However, on January 23, 2019, it was reported that Gorgees had pulled out of the fight, and was replaced by Callan Potter. Turner won the fight via knockout in the first round.

Turner faced Matt Frevola on April 13, 2019 at UFC 236. He lost the fight by unanimous decision.

Turner was scheduled to face Jamie Mullarkey on February 23, 2020 at UFC Fight Night 168. However Mullarkey was forced to withdraw from the bout due to injury and he was replaced by Joshua Culibao. Turner won the fight via TKO in the second round.

Turner was scheduled to face Thiago Moisés on September 5, 2020 at UFC Fight Night 176. However, on September 5, 2020, Moisés tested positive for Covid-19 and the bout against Turner was cancelled. In turn, Turner was quickly rescheduled and faced Brok Weaver on September 12, 2020 at UFC Fight Night 177. After knocking Weaver down multiple times, Turner won the fight via a rear–naked choke submission in round two.

Turner faced Uroš Medić on September 25, 2021 at UFC 266. He won the fight via rear naked choke in round one.

Turner faced Jamie Mullarkey on March 5, 2022 at UFC 272. He won the fight via technical knockout in round two.

Turner faced Brad Riddell on on July 2, 2022, at UFC 276. He won the bout via guillotine choke submission less than a minute into the contest. This win earned him a Performance of the Night award.

Turner was scheduled to face Dan Hooker on March 4, 2023, at UFC 285.  However, Hooker was forced to withdraw from the event, citing a hand injury, and he was replaced by Mateusz Gamrot. In a closely contested bout where Gamrot employed his wrestling to combat Turner’s reach advantage, Turner lost by split decision.

Championships and awards

Mixed martial arts
Ultimate Fighting Championship
 Performance of the Night (One time)

Mixed martial arts record

|-
|Loss
|align=center|13–6
|Mateusz Gamrot
|Decision (split)
|UFC 285
|
|align=center|3
|align=center|5:00
|Las Vegas, Nevada, United States
|
|-
|Win
|align=center|13–5
|Brad Riddell
|Submission (guillotine choke)
|UFC 276
| 
|align=center|1
|align=center|0:45
|Las Vegas, Nevada, United States
|
|-
|Win
|align=center|12–5
|Jamie Mullarkey
|TKO (punches)
|UFC 272
|
|align=center|2
|align=center|0:46
|Las Vegas, Nevada, United States
|
|-
|Win
|align=center|11–5
|Uroš Medić
|Submission (rear-naked choke)
|UFC 266
|
|align=center|1
|align=center|4:01
|Las Vegas, Nevada, United States
|
|-
|Win
|align=center|10–5
|Brok Weaver
|Submission (rear-naked choke)
|UFC Fight Night: Waterson vs. Hill
|
|align=center|2
|align=center|4:20
|Las Vegas, Nevada, United States
|
|-
|Win
|align=center|9–5
|Joshua Culibao
|TKO (punches)
|UFC Fight Night: Felder vs. Hooker
|
|align=center|2
|align=center|3:01
|Auckland, New Zealand
|
|-
|Loss
|align=center|8–5
|Matt Frevola
|Decision (unanimous)
|UFC 236
|
|align=center|3
|align=center|5:00
|Atlanta, Georgia, United States
|
|-
|Win 
|align=center|8–4 
|Callan Potter
|TKO (punches)
|UFC 234
|
|align=center|1 
|align=center|0:53
|Melbourne, Australia
|
|-
|Loss 
|align=center|7–4 
|Vicente Luque
|KO (punches)
|UFC 229
|
|align=center|1 
|align=center|3:52 
|Las Vegas, Nevada, United States
|
|-
| 
| align=center|7–3
| Max Mustaki
| TKO (doctor stoppage)
| Dana White's Contender Series 12
| 
| align=center|1
| align=center|5:00
| Las Vegas, Nevada, United States
|
|-
| 
| align=center|6–3
| Noah Tillis
| TKO (punches)
| Bellator 192
| 
| align=center|1
| align=center|1:12
| Inglewood, California, United States
|
|-
| 
| align=center|5–3
| Vytautas Sadauskas
| Submission (triangle choke)
| KOTC: Never Quit
| 
| align=center|1
| align=center|1:39
| Ontario, California, United States
|
|-
| 
| align=center|4–3
| Richard LeRoy
| TKO (punches)
| CXF 8 : Cali Kings
| 
| align=center|3
| align=center|4:18
| Burbank, California, United States
|
|-
| 
| align=center|4–2
| Paradise Vaovasa
| KO (knee to the body)
| TPF 31
| 
| align=center|1
| align=center|1:30
| Lemoore, California, United States
|
|-
| 
| align=center|3–2
| Gabriel Green
| KO (punches)
| Bellator 170
| 
| align=center|1
| align=center|0:36
| Inglewood, California, United States
|
|-
| 
| align=center|2–2
| Andrew Lagdaan
| Decision (split)
| SMASH Global 4: Fight Bullying
| 
| align=center|3
| align=center|5:00
| Los Angeles, California, United States
|
|-
| 
| align=center|2–1
| Ronnie Borja
| TKO (punches)
| California Fight League 8
| 
| align=center|1
| align=center|0:11
| Victorville, California, United States
|
|-
| 
| align=center|2–0
| Adrian Ajoleza
| TKO (body kick)
| BAMMA Badbeat 20 Saunders vs. Culley
| 
| align=center|1
| align=center|4:55
| Commerce, California, United States
|
|-
| 
| align=center|1–0
| Eric Steans
| KO (punch)
| WSOF 28
| 
| align=center|1
| align=center|0:32
| Garden Grove, California, United States
|
|-

References

External links
 
 

1995 births
Living people
Sportspeople from San Bernardino, California
Mixed martial artists from California
American male mixed martial artists
Lightweight mixed martial artists
Welterweight mixed martial artists
Mixed martial artists utilizing wrestling
Mixed martial artists utilizing Brazilian jiu-jitsu
Ultimate Fighting Championship male fighters
American practitioners of Brazilian jiu-jitsu